Belsize Square Synagogue is a synagogue and Jewish community in Belsize Park, Hampstead, in the London Borough of Camden. It is independent, drawing from the worship tradition of German Liberal Judaism.

Affiliation 

Belsize Square Synagogue is independent and not affiliated to any synagogal grouping. Unique within the UK, it derives from continental Liberal Judaism, having been founded in 1939 by refugees mainly from Germany. While today the membership of Belsize Square Synagogue comprises people who have joined from other strands of Judaism alongside the families of its founders, this history is reflected especially in the dignity of its religious services, mainly conducted in Hebrew, and its music. This was mainly composed by Louis Lewandowski (b.1821), who was based in Berlin and influenced by Felix Mendelssohn, and by Salomon Sulzer (b.1804), a Viennese cantor and contemporary and friend of Franz Schubert.

Services 
Religious services are held every Friday evening and Saturday morning and on Jewish festivals and Belsize Square Synagogue is known by its music led by Cantor, Choir and organ following the German Liberale tradition and composers Louis Lewandowski (Berlin) and Salomon Sulzer (Vienna) between others. A Sunday tefilin minyan (congregation) meets occasionally with the future bnei Mitzvah kids and adults before Cheder's Assembly. Men and women sit together and both may be called up to read from the Torah. Children's services (known as Kikar Kids) are held on the first Saturday morning of the month.

Belsize Square Synagogue services are live-streamed via its website, with the support of grant funding from the Six Point Foundation, and by a donation from the Ann Hirschfield Trust. They have been especially vital to its own and the larger community during the COVID-19 restrictions, even weddings have been livestreamed.

Education 
Belsize Square has a cheder (religion school) for children and a regular adult discussion group, both meeting in term on Sunday mornings. An "Introduction to Judaism" class meets on Monday evenings, and forms part of Belsize Square Synagogue's programme of activities for people converting to Judaism.

This regular education programme is supplemented by ad hoc lectures, events, film presentations and short courses.

Other activities 
Belsize Square Synagogue has a programme of youth activities including summer and winter weekend camps and a football club (Alyth Belsize, shared with Alyth Gardens Synagogue).

In conjunction with volunteers, the synagogue's community care co-ordinator provides support and assistance to older members of the congregation and others in need including those experiencing bereavement or ill-health.

Part of the Belsize Square Synagogue building is used by Kerens Day Nursery during the week.

Further reading 

 Antony Godfrey (2005), Three Rabbis in a Vicarage: The Story of Belsize Square Synagogue.  London: Larsen Grove Press.

External links 
 Belsize Square Synagogue
 Keren day nursery
 Six Point Foundation
 Cantor Heller

Ashkenazi Jewish culture in London
Ashkenazi synagogues
German-Jewish culture in the United Kingdom
Synagogues in London
Belsize Park
Jewish German history
Unaffiliated synagogues
Synagogues completed in 1951